Sains-en-Gohelle is a commune in the Pas-de-Calais department in the Hauts-de-France region of France.

Geography
The A26 autoroute passes through the town.

Coal mining

Excavation of Mine 10 by the Compagnie des mines de Béthune started in July 1900 at Sains-en-Gohelle, and eventually reached .
Shaft 10bis was started in July 1901 and reached .
Production started in 1903.
The mine closed in 1957 and was back-filled in 1972.
Surface installations were destroyed in 1975.

Population

Places of interest
 The church of St.Vaast, dating from the twelfth century.
 The modern church of Saint Marguerite.

See also 
 Communes of the Pas-de-Calais department
 Guy Dangain (born 12 July 1935), French classical flutist.

References

External links

 Official town website 
 Website of the Communaupole de Lens-Liévin

Sainsengohelle
Artois